Bienstock is a surname. Notable people with the surname include:

Freddy Bienstock (1923–2009), American music publisher
Jay Bienstock (born 1965), American television producer
Miriam Bienstock (1923–2015), American record company executive
Ric Esther Bienstock, Canadian documentary filmmaker